Sigríður Jóhanna Friðjónsdóttir (born 28 November 1961) is the Director of Public Prosecutions in Iceland.

Education
Sigríður graduated from the University of Iceland in 1986 and studied British litigation law at University College London in 1987.

Career
She became a prosecutor at the Public Prosecutor's Office on 10 August 10 1998 and was a named Deputy Public Prosecutor in September 2008. She was appointed Director of Public Prosecutions on 4 April 2011.

References

1961 births
Icelandic lawyers
Living people